"Shot Me Down" is a song by French house music producer and DJ David Guetta, featuring vocals from American singer Skylar Grey. The song was released on 3 February 2014 as a digital download. It was produced by David Guetta and Giorgio Tuinfort, with additional production from Ralph Wegner. The song has peaked at number six on the French Singles Chart, while also peaking within the top ten of the charts in Belgium, the United Kingdom, Ireland, Denmark, Hungary and Australia and the top twenty of the charts in Germany, Spain and Italy. The original version of the song, "Bang Bang (My Baby Shot Me Down)", was released by Cher in 1966 and was famously covered by Nancy Sinatra in the same year.

Critical reception
DJ Times described the song as "A clear departure from Guetta’s pop anthems of the past few years" and compared "the electro frenzy of percussion-laden drops and grinding pops" to Martin Garrix's song "Animals". Mike Wass of Idolator wrote: "The track closely follows Avicii's 'Wake Me Up' formula of blending raw acoustic moments — courtesy of Skylar Grey's husky vocal — with bone-rattling beats and the radio version simply trims away some of the instrumental." Robert Copsey of Digital Spy gave the song a mixed review stating:
"Even before listening to David Guetta's new single, it's difficult not to think, is this really necessary? And if you feel like you've already heard it before actually hearing it, it's because essentially you have; the Cher/Nancy Sinatra classic has not only been covered to death already, but a dance version created by production duo Audio Bullys in 2005 remains perfectly serviceable today. So why is he bothering? Surprisingly, the song's infamous chorus remains largely similar to the original here, even with Skylar Grey's vocal, which bears a haunting resemblance to Sinatra's. It's a shame then that it's been sandwiched between sections of menacing beats, strobing EDM and grinding bass. In separation they both sound like promising songs, but together, the result feels lazy and disjointed."

Track listings

Charts and certifications

Weekly charts

Year-end chart

Certifications

Release history

References

2014 singles
2014 songs
David Guetta songs
Skylar Grey songs
Songs written by David Guetta
Songs written by Giorgio Tuinfort
Songs written by Sonny Bono
Parlophone singles
Song recordings produced by David Guetta
Animated music videos